Liberty, Oklahoma is a town in Tulsa and Okmulgee counties, Oklahoma, United States.

Liberty, Oklahoma may also refer to:

Liberty, Sequoyah County, Oklahoma, an unincorporated community

Unincorporated